Desmond R. Tuiavi'i (born Apia, 14 January 1970) is a Samoan former rugby union player. He played as a flanker.

Career
He had five international caps for Samoa in 2003, being his first against Ireland, at Apia, on 20 June 2003. He played three matches in the 2003 Rugby World Cup, against Uruguay, England and South Africa. After the match against the Springboks, he was not called anymore for the national team. He also played in the Super 14 for the NSW Waratahs and the ACT Brumbies, and then in 2003 he moved to England to play for the Rotherham Titans.

Desmond now lives in Noordwijk, the Netherlands, and is coach of the Bassets Under 18 in Sassenheim. In 2018 he was co-founder of Invictus Rugby Club Noordwijk.

Notes

External links

Des R. Tuiavii at New Zealand Rugby History

1970 births
Living people
Samoan rugby union players
Sportspeople from Apia
Samoan expatriates in New Zealand
Samoan expatriates in Australia
Samoan expatriates in the United Kingdom
Rugby union flankers
Samoa international rugby union players